Sarmad Hameed (born 28 May 1994) is a Pakistani first-class cricketer who plays for Northern. He was the leading run-scorer for Rawalpindi in the 2017–18 Quaid-e-Azam Trophy, with 382 runs in seven matches. He made his Twenty20 debut on 30 September 2021, for Northern in the 2021–22 National T20 Cup.

References

External links
 

1994 births
Living people
Pakistani cricketers
Rawalpindi cricketers
People from Jhelum